The Indiana CPA Society (INCPAS) is a statewide association representing current or aspiring certified public accountants (CPAs) and related professionals in Indiana. INCPAS was founded in 1915 with nine charter members and has since grown to nearly 7,000 members.

History

In 2013, it launched the INCPAS Scholars career awareness and mentorship program for underrepresented high school students interested in pursuing accounting.

In 2014, it established the CPA Center of Excellence® subsidiary that provides CPAs with competency-based learning on non-technical skills.

In 2015, it celebrated its 100th anniversary.

In 2017, Indiana Gov. Eric Holcomb signed HEA 1467 into law, making Indiana the first state in the nation to count competency-based learning towards continuing professional education (CPE) requirements.

References 

 "Indiana CPAs and Their Association: A Century of Service" (Gould, 2015)

External Links 
 www.in.gov/pla Indiana Professional Licensing Agency
 www.in.gov/pla/professions/indiana-board-of-accountancy Indiana Board of Accountancy
 www.incpas.org Indiana CPA Society
 www.incpas.org/Staff INCPAS Staff Directory
 www.incpas.org/Scholars INCPAS Scholars Program
 www.incpas.org/Scholarship Indiana CPA Educational Foundation Scholarship

Organizations based in Indiana
Professional accounting bodies